Marie-Claire Zimmermann (born 10 June 1975 in Vienna, Austria) is an Austrian journalist and television presenter, who presents Austrian TV program Zeit im Bild.

References 

20th-century Austrian journalists
Austrian women journalists
Living people
1975 births
Mass media people from Vienna
Austrian television presenters
Austrian women television presenters
21st-century Austrian journalists